Yanaizu Dam is a gravity dam on the Tadami River  upstream of Yanaizu in the Fukushima Prefecture of Japan. It was constructed between December 1952 and August 1953 for the purpose of hydroelectric power generation. It supplies a 75 MW power station with water.

See also

Katakado Dam – located downstream
Miyashita Dam – located upstream

References

Dams in Fukushima Prefecture
Hydroelectric power stations in Japan
Dams completed in 1953
Dams on the Tadami River
Energy infrastructure completed in 1953
Gravity dams
1953 establishments in Japan